Kurt Bachmann (July 18, 1936 – August 29, 2014) was a Filipino basketball player who competed in the 1960 Summer Olympics. Bachmann was born in Iloilo City.

Aside from being a three-time member of the men's national team, Kurt played a big role and help the De La Salle University in capturing the NCAA senior's title in 1956. He also played for YCO Painters and Ysmael Steel Admirals in the MICAA in the late-1950s til the 1960s.

References

External links
 

1936 births
2014 deaths
Basketball players from Iloilo
Sportspeople from Iloilo City
De La Salle Green Archers basketball players
Asian Games medalists in basketball
Basketball players at the 1958 Asian Games
Basketball players at the 1960 Summer Olympics
Basketball players at the 1962 Asian Games
Filipino people of German descent
Filipino people of Spanish descent
Olympic basketball players of the Philippines
Philippines men's national basketball team players
Filipino men's basketball players
1959 FIBA World Championship players
Asian Games gold medalists for the Philippines
Visayan people
Medalists at the 1958 Asian Games
Medalists at the 1962 Asian Games
Philippine Sports Hall of Fame inductees